Salvatore Caruso and Jonathan Eysseric were the defending champions but chose not to defend their title.

Daniele Bracciali and Matteo Donati won the title after defeating Tomislav Brkić and Ante Pavić 6–3, 3–6, [10–7] in the final.

Seeds

Draw

References
 Main Draw

Internazionali di Tennis Città di Perugia - Doubles
2018 Doubles